David Garrick (29 January 1947 – 28 February 1985), better known by his stage name David Byron, was a British singer, who was best known in the early 1970s as the lead vocalist with the rock band Uriah Heep. Byron possessed a powerful operatic voice and a flamboyant stage presence.

Early life (1958–1969)
David Byron was educated at Independent school (United Kingdom) Forest School, Walthamstow, from 1958–1964, where, as a popular pupil he excelled at sports and was in the school 1st XI football team. From the mid-1960s to early 1970s, he did session work for a company called Avenue Recordings, singing lead and backing vocals (occasionally along with Mick Box on guitar and Paul Newton on bass). These were cover versions of Top 20 hits and were released on EPs and LPs.

His first venture into professional music was with an Epping-based semi-pro band called The Stalkers, which also featured Box. Byron and Box then teamed up to form the band Spice (1967–1969), which also featured Newton on bass and Alex Napier on drums. Before settling on the name Spice other names were considered including 'The Play' and a handful of acetates exist of unreleased tracks recorded at the time and credited to 'The Play'. The band gigged extensively locally under the management of Paul Newton's father and they secured a recording deal with United Artists, which issued the band's only single "What About The Music/In Love"; copies of which now fetch around $50 to $100 on the collectors' market.

Deciding that the Spice sound would require keyboards, they recruited keyboardist/guitarist/singer/songwriter Ken Hensley, who was Newton's bandmate in The Gods. During this time, Byron renamed the band Uriah Heep from the Charles Dickens novel David Copperfield.

With Uriah Heep 1969–1976

Byron sang on ten Uriah Heep albums: Very 'eavy Very 'Umble, Salisbury, Look at Yourself, Demons and Wizards, The Magician's Birthday, Live, Sweet Freedom, Wonderworld, Return To Fantasy, and High and Mighty. In 1975, Byron released his first solo album, Take No Prisoners, which also featured fellow Heep members Box, Hensley and Lee Kerslake. Byron also gained a reputation for hard drinking, which eventually led to him being sacked from Uriah Heep at the end of a Spanish tour in July 1976.

Hensley said at the time, "David was one of those classic people who couldn't face up to the fact that things were wrong and he looked for solace in a bottle." Ahead of his dismissal, Uriah Heep had secured John Lawton as replacement singer. Their manager at the time, Bron said Byron had been released in "the best interest of the group". Bron explained that Byron and the other Uriah Heep members had been in disagreement for some time over fundamental issues of group policy, and that the differences had been finally brought to a head following the band's recent tour of Britain and Europe. "It was felt by the rest of the group that they could no longer reconcile David's attitude with their own," commented Bron.

Later career (1975–1984)
Byron recorded three solo albums: Take No Prisoners in 1975, Baby Faced Killer in 1978, and That Was Only Yesterday, which was recorded in 1984, one year before his death. During this period, Byron teamed up with former Colosseum / Humble Pie guitarist Clem Clempson and former Wings drummer Geoff Britton to form Rough Diamond. They recorded one self-titled LP for Island Records in March 1977. The album sold poorly and Byron quit.

Next, Byron got together with guitarist Robin George to form The Byron Band, which was signed to Creole Records ( a label which was perhaps an inapposite choice since it specialised in early reggae, showcasing artists like Sugar Minott and Max Romeo) and debuted with the single "Every Inch of the Way/Routine" (CR 8). This was followed by the single "Never Say Die/Tired Eyes", before the release of the 1981 album On the Rocks (CRX 2). However, as with his previous band Rough Diamond, neither critical nor commercial acclaim was forthcoming.

Box and Trevor Bolder invited Byron to re-join Uriah Heep in 1981, after Ken Hensley had left, but Byron refused.

Lost and Found is a double album that included demos and live recordings by the Byron Band, which spanned from 1980 to 1982. It also includes a Robin George solo track.

Death and legacy
Byron died of alcohol-related complications, including liver disease and seizures, at his home in Berkshire on 28 February 1985. He was 38 years old. On BBC Radio's The Friday Rock Show, Tommy Vance played "July Morning" in tribute.

On the "Equator" tour, around the time of Byron's death, Uriah Heep dedicated "The Wizard" to him. There were also tributes to him and deceased bassist Gary Thain on the 1998 album Sonic Origami.

Discography

Solo albums
 Take No Prisoners – 1975
 Baby Faced Killer – 1978 
 That Was Only Yesterday – The Last EP – Recorded 1984, released 2008

with the Byron Band
 On the Rocks – 1981
 Lost and Found – Recorded 1980–82, released 2003

with Uriah Heep
 Very 'Eavy... Very 'Umble – 1970 
 Salisbury – 1971 
 Look at Yourself – 1971 
 Demons and Wizards – 1972
 The Magician's Birthday – 1972
 Uriah Heep Live – 1973
 Sweet Freedom – 1973
 Wonderworld – 1974
 Return to Fantasy – 1975
 High and Mighty – 1976 
 Live at Shepperton '74 – Recorded 1974, released 1986
 The Lansdowne Tapes – Recorded 1969–71, released 1993

with Rough Diamond
 Rough Diamond – 1977

Footnotes

References

External links
  Uriah Heep official website
 Official website for pre-1986 Uriah Heep

1947 births
1985 deaths
20th-century English male singers
20th-century English singers
English male singer-songwriters
English rock singers
English heavy metal singers
English tenors
Uriah Heep (band) members
People from Epping
Alcohol-related deaths in England
Bronze Records artists